Pandoraea apista is a Gram-negative, catalase-positive, aerobic, non-spore-forming, motile bacterium with a single polar flagellum, of the genus Pandoraea. The Strain CCUG 38412 was isolated from the sputum of a cystic fibrosis patient in Denmark. Pandoraea apista can cause lung disease, such as chronic lung infections, in patients who suffer from cystic fibrosis.

Etymology
Pandoraea apista is named from Pandora's box and the Greek word apistos which means disloyal or treacherous.

References

External links
Type strain of Pandoraea apista at BacDive -  the Bacterial Diversity Metadatabase

Burkholderiaceae